A skylight (sometimes called a rooflight) is a light-permitting structure or window, usually made of transparent or translucent glass, that forms all or part of the roof space of a building for daylighting and ventilation purposes.

History
Open skylights were used in Ancient Roman architecture, such as the oculus of the Pantheon. Glazed 'closed' skylights have been in use since the Industrial Revolution made advances in glass production manufacturing. Mass production   units since the mid-20th century have brought skylights to many uses and contexts. Energy conservation has brought new motivation, design innovation, transmission options, and efficiency rating systems for skylights.

Prior to the Industrial Revolution, it was Spain and France that probably had the leading technology in architectural glass. One of the earliest forms of glass skylight can be seen at the Burgos Cathedral in the Chapel of the Constable. Other early form of glass skylight can be seen at the Palace of Versailles in the Galerie des Batailles, which was added onto the existing palace by Louis Philippe in 1830. Another form that displays early sky lighting technology is the Halle aux blés (Paris) built in 1763–67. This form of natural overhead lighting allowed for illumination while decoration could cover the entire interior wall, and it is the option least obstructed by other buildings. This means that sky lighting as we know it, in many forms today, was probably pioneered in France during the early 18th century or late 17th century. According to architectural glass, the earliest functional skylights would have been formed by either glass casting, crown glass (window), cylinder blown sheet, and machine drawn cylinder sheet, or Fourcault process.

Description
Skylighting types include roof windows, unit skylights, tubular daylighting devices (TDDs), sloped glazing, and custom skylights. Uses include:

 daylighting elements used to allow direct and/or indirect sunlight, via toplighting.
 providing a visual connection to the outdoor environment to interior occupants.
 sustainable building—passive solar heating, and with operable units; ventilation for passive cooling and fresh air exchange.

 Open skylight
An unglazed hole in a roof.
 Fixed unit skylight

A fixed skylight consists of a structural perimeter frame supporting glazing infill (the light-transmitting portion, which is made primarily of glass or plastic). A fixed skylight is non-operable, meaning there is no ventilation.
 Operable skylight
An operable (venting) unit skylight uses a hinged sash attached to and supported by the frame. When within reach of the occupants, this type is also called a roof window.
 Retractable skylight

A retractable skylight rolls (on a set of tracks) off the frame, so that the interior of the facility is entirely open to the outdoors, i.e., not impeded by a hinged skylight. The terms retractable skylight and retractable roof are often used interchangeably, though skylight implies a degree of transparency.
 Tubular daylight device

Active daylighting uses a tubular daylighting device (TDD). Solar tubes, sun tunnels, or tubular skylights consist of a roof-mounted fixed unit skylight element, condensing sunlight, distributed by a light conveying optic conduit to a light diffusing element. Being small in diameter, they can be used for daylighting smaller spaces such as hallways, and bounce light in darker corners of spaces. TDDs harvest daylight through a roof-mounted dome with diameters ranging from about 10 inches for residential applications to 22 inches for commercial buildings. Made from acrylic or polycarbonate formulated to block ultraviolet rays, the dome captures and redirects light rays into an aluminum tubing system that resembles ductwork.

Sloped glazing
Sloped glazing differs from other "skylights" in that one assembly contains multiple infill panels in a framing system, usually designed for a specific project and installed in sections on site.

Pavement lights
Pavement lights are walk-on skylights. They are set into sidewalks, open areas, and well-lit interior floors as laylights.

Prism lights
Prism lights are sometimes used as skylights; they redirect the light passing through.

Solar architecture
Skylights are widely used in designing daylighting for residential, public, and commercial buildings. Increased daylighting can result in less electrical lighting use and smaller sized window glazing (sidelighting), saving energy, lowering costs, and reducing environmental impacts.  Daylighting can cut lighting energy use in some buildings by up to 80%.

Toplighting (skylights) works well with sidelighting (windows) to maximize daylighting: 
 toplighting is able to bring light into centralized areas of a building
 daylight is available throughout the day from both ambient lighting from the sky and direct exposure to the sun.
 modern transparent and/or translucent glazing can be utilized to avoid glare, aid in capturing sunlight at low angles and diffuse light to wider areas of floor space.

Even on overcast days, toplighting from skylights is three to ten times more efficient than sidelighting.

Materials

Glass
Many recent advances in both glass and plastic infill systems have greatly benefited all skylight types. Some advances increase thermal performance, some are focused on preserving and utilizing daylight potential, and some are designed to enhance strength, durability, fire resistance and other performance measures.

Contemporary skylights using glass infill (windows) typically use sealed insulating glass units (IGU) made with two panes of glass. These types of products are NFRC-ratable for visible transmittance. Assemblies with three panes can sometimes be cost-justified in the coldest climate zones, but they lose some light by adding the third layer of glass.

Glass units typically include at least one low emissivity (Low-E) coating applied to one or more glass surfaces to reduce the U-factor and especially SHGC by suppressing radiant heat flow. Many varieties of Low-E coatings also reduce daylight potential to different degrees. High purity inert gas is frequently used in the space(s) between panes, and advances in thermally efficient glass spacing and supporting elements can further improve thermal performance of glass-glazed skylight assemblies.

Plastic
Plastic glazing infill is commonly used in many skylights and TDDs. These assemblies typically contain thermally formed domes, but molded shapes are not uncommon. Domed skylights are typically used on low slope roofs. The dome shape allows for shedding of water and burning embers.

Plastics used in skylights are UV stabilized and may feature other advances to improve thermal properties. Lack of accepted standards for measuring light transmittance is a disadvantage for comparing and choosing skylights with plastic glazing.

Acrylic is the most common plastic glazing used for dome skylights. However, Polycarbonate and Copolyester materials are also used as glazing, where additional properties such as impact resistance may be required.

Rating systems
NFRC: rating for visible transmittance

U-factor: expresses the heat loss performance of any building assembly.

SHGC–Solar Heat Gain Coefficient: measures the assembly’s transfer of heat from outside to inside that is caused by sunlight.

These properties are labeled in the U.S. as a decimal between zero and one, with lower numbers indicating lower heat transfer rates. Depending on the geographic region, optimal U-factor and SHGC performance will vary. In the sunny southern climate zones, a lower SHGC is more important than lower U-factor. In the cooler northern climate zones, lower U-factor is more important, and higher SHGC can be justified.

In selection of skylights, a balance is sought between low U-factor and optimal SHGC values, while preserving enough daylight supply to minimize artificial light use. Automatic light sensing controls for electric lighting maximize energy savings.

Benefits
A study concluded that students have significantly higher test scores in classrooms that optimize daylighting, than classrooms that do not. Other studies show that daylight positively affects physiological and psychological well-being, which can increase productivity in many contexts, such as sales in retail spaces.

In terms of cost savings, U.S. DOE reported that many commercial buildings can reduce total energy costs by up to one-third through the optimal use of daylighting. The majority of commercial warehouses and 'big box stores' built in recent years have used skylights extensively for energy/costs savings.

See also
Cupola
Daylight factor
Glass brick
Light tube
Passive daylighting
Passive solar building design
 Passive solar lighting
Roof lantern
Roshandan

References

External links
 

Lighting
Windows
Energy-saving lighting
Roofs
Sustainable building
Solar architecture